Seguros Universal is an all lines insurance company founded in 1964. It is licensed to operate in the Dominican Republic.  Currently the leader in most lines of insurance in the country. At the moment, the company holds around 32% of the insurance market in that country.

Seguros Universal was founded by a group of insurance professionals headed by Rafael A. De León. In 1983 the company was purchased by Grupo Popular, the largest financial entity in the country, and Mr. Alejandro E. Grullón was named president of the company.  In 2005, Grupo Popular decided to concentrate its operation in its banking business and sold the company to a group of very well known Dominican businessman headed by Mr. Ernesto Izquierdo, current president of the company.

History 
La Universal Compañía General de Seguros was founded in 1964, by Don Rafael De León.

This company characterizes from its origins by its high morality and fulfillment, arriving to be placed in the market like one of the first insuring companies.

In the 1983, the Universal  was acquired by Grupo Popular, and was  relaunched  by its  president, Don Alejandro E. Grullon E.
From then, and under the position of a guardian of Grupo Popular, the Universal continued the footpath of a constant and sharp fortification, and it is in 2001 when one of the fusions of greater impact in the sector of insurances takes place. This fusion was carried out between two enterprise companies with one long trajectory of prestige, successes and financial strength; both with a deep knowledge of the responsibilities towards its insured, and at the same time, with an ample and exact dominion of the ethics and the morality. The union of America Insurances, presided over by the Dr. Luis Augusto Ginebra, and the Universal Insurances, presided by Ing. Ernesto Izquierdo, gave birth to Universal-América.
For year 2003, this company, being one of the branches of the Popular Group, is baptized with the Seguros Popular, insisting on which the name changes.

At this moment Seguros Popular gave beginning to a program of change of culture, to hit the aspect Service, like part of the strategy of differentiation by the service to the client. The company centralized all the processes on watch in a structure that represents the client including an area on watch to the physical client. In addition to this the most modern Technological Platform was gotten up, that aligns all the units of businesses to offer a service based on the use of better practices and standards of the business.

References

External links 
 Official homepage
 History (ES)(SP)
 Seguros

Financial services companies established in 1964
Insurance companies of the Dominican Republic